Eriborus is a genus of parasitoid wasps belonging to the family Ichneumonidae.

The genus has almost cosmopolitan distribution.

Species:
 Eriborus achalicus Dbar & Saparmamedova, 1988 
 Eriborus acutulus Momoi, 1970

References

Ichneumonidae
Ichneumonidae genera